Paul Kelly (born 15 February 1960) is a New Zealand former cricketer. He played 49 first-class and 36 List A matches for Auckland between 1980 and 1990.

See also
 List of Auckland representative cricketers

References

External links
 

1960 births
Living people
New Zealand cricketers
Auckland cricketers
Cricketers from Palmerston North